Teldenia ruficosta is a moth in the family Drepanidae. It was described by Warren in 1922. It is found in West Papua.

The length of the forewings is about 15 mm for males and 15.5-16.5 mm for females. The forewings have a white costa and the fringe is buff. There is also a dark brown terminal fascia. The hindwings are as the forewings.

References

Moths described in 1922
Drepaninae